Moore Haven Junior Senior High School is located in Moore Haven, Florida and is a Glades County, Florida public school. It was established in 1968 when it was split off from a shared campus with the elementary school The school is located in a rural town on the southwestern shore of Lake Okeechobee, the school serves students from Muse; Ortona; Palmdale; Crescent Acres; Horseshoe Acres; Hendry Isles; North LaBelle; Lakeport; Buckhead Ridge; and the Brighton Seminole Indian Reservation. The student body is made up of Native Americans, Hispanics, African Americans and Caucasians from grades 6–12.  The campus includes an auditorium, a gymnasium, and  a football field with six-lane track.  Baseball and softball fields are located nearby.  It was rated a C-school in 2011–2012.

References

1968 establishments in Florida
Educational institutions established in 1968
Public high schools in Florida
Public middle schools in Florida
Schools in Glades County, Florida